Euscorpiops is a genus of scorpion in the family Euscorpiidae.

Species 
 Euscorpiops asthenurus (Pocock, 1900) 
 Euscorpiops bhutanensis (Tikader & Bastawade, 1983) 
 Euscorpiops binghamii (Pocock, 1893) 
 Euscorpiops kaftani (Kovarik, 1993) 
 Euscorpiops karschi Qi, Zhu & Lourenço, 2005
 Euscorpiops kubani Kovarik, 2004 
 Euscorpiops longimanus (Pocock, 1893) 
 Euscorpiops montanus (Karsch, 1879)
 Euscorpiops shidian Qi, Zhu & Lourenço, 2005
 Euscorpiops vachoni Qi, Zhu & Lourenço, 2005

References 

 Biolib

Scorpion genera
Euscorpiidae